Ram Rajasekharan (born 25 December 1960) is an Indian plant biologist, food technologist and a former director of the Central Food Technological Research Institute (CFTRI), a constituent laboratory of the Council of Scientific and Industrial Research. Known for his studies on plant lipid metabolism, Rajasekharan is a former professor of eminence at the Indian Institute of Science and an elected fellow of all the three major Indian science academies namely Indian Academy of Sciences, National Academy of Sciences, India and Indian National Science Academy as well as the National Academy of Agricultural Sciences. The Department of Biotechnology of the Government of India awarded him the National Bioscience Award for Career Development, one of the highest Indian science awards, for his contributions to biosciences in 2001.

Biography 

Ram Rajasekharan was born on Christmas Day, 1960 at Manamadurai taluk, Sivaganga district of the south Indian state of Tamil Nadu. He was the first graduate from his village when he earned a BSc in zoology and botany from Madurai Kamaraj University after which he continued at the university to complete an MSc in integrated biology. His doctoral studies were at the Indian Institute of Science from where he secured a PhD in 1987 in biochemistry and moved to the US to do his post-doctoral work at the University of Illinois at Urbana–Champaign in 1987 after which he worked with DuPont at their biotechnology division as a junior investigator from 1989 to 1991. Subsequently, he had a stint at Monsanto, St. Louis and at the New Mexico State University before returning to India in 1995 to take up the position of an assistant professor at the department of biochemistry of the Indian Institute of Science. He worked at IISc till 2009 during which period he served as an associate professor (2001–07) and was serving as a professor when he was offered the directorship of the Central Institute of Medicinal and Aromatic Plants, a position he held for three years. In 2012, he returned to South India as the director of the Central Food Technological Research Institute (CFTRI) and worked till he was replaced by Jitendra J. Jadhav in 2017. He also served as a visiting professor at the School of Science of Monash University from 2007 to 2010.

Legacy 

Rajasekharan's research centers around plant lipid metabolism with special focus on the molecular biology and biochemistry of plant oils. He investigated the possibilities of using plant oils and fats as nutraceuticals and diet supplements and worked towards the improvement of crops which had such potential. At the Central Institute of Medicinal and Aromatic Plants, he led a project titled "Fork to Farm" that concentrated on two themes, development of fatty acid-derived biofuel and the production of hydrogen using algae. He had also started a unique "Waste to wealth" program of making agarbathis from spent flowers from the temples to help the women self help groups in Uttar Pradesh. At CFTRI, he worked on metabolic engineering to produce DAG-anti-obesity oil  He also introduced crop cultivation of non-native plants such as Salvia hispanica (chia), Chenopodium quinoa (quinoa), Eragrostis tef (teff), Portulaca oleracea (common purslane), Talinum fruticosum (Philippine spinach) and Buglossoides arvensis (corn gromwell) in India as a part of the program. It was under his leadership, CFTRI helped in the formation of a farmers' Co-operative society "Raita Mitra" to help farmers sell their produce at reasonable price. CFTRI also entered into a cooperation with Grassroots Research and Advocacy Movement (GRAAM), a non governmental organization, for supporting tribal women entrepreneurs through transfer of modern technology.

Rajasekharan holds 11 patents for the processes he has developed of which nine has been licensed to companies including Dow Chemicals, Nagarjuna Group.  He has also collaborated with noted biochemists such as P. N. Rangarajan and Govindarajan Padmanaban. His studies have been documented by way of a number of articles and the online repository of scientific articles of the Indian Academy of Sciences has listed 24 of them. He has also delivered several invited speeches at various conferences and served as a member of the advisory committee of many conferences and has organized 2 major annual events of the Society of Biological Chemists (India) at Lucknow and Mysore.

Awards and honors 
The Department of Biotechnology of the Government of India awarded Rajasekharan the National Bioscience Award for Career Development, one of the highest Indian science awards in 2001. He received the Sir C. V. Raman State Award in Life Sciences of the Karnataka State Council for Science and Technology in 2004 and the Pro Vice-chancellor's Award for excellence in research of Monash University for two consecutive years in 2008 and 2009. He is also a recipient of the Nagarjuna Group Agricultural Biotechnology Excellence Award, 2011 I. S. Bhatia Memorial Award of the Society of Biological Chemists and the 2012 CSIR Technology Award for Life Sciences, of the Council of Scientific and Industrial Research.

Rajasekharan was elected as a member of Guha Research Conference in 2002. The National Academy of Agricultural Sciences elected him as a fellow in 2003 followed by National Academy of Sciences, India in 2005. Subsequently, the Indian Academy of Sciences and the Indian National Science Academy also made him their fellow in 2006 and 2012 respectively. The Department of Science and Technology of the Government of India selected him for J. C. Bose National Fellowship in 2013.

Job transfer controversy 
Ram Rajasekharan was in the news in 2014 when people allegedly belonging to Karnataka Rakshana Vedike, a pro-Kannada non governmental organization, manhandled him, alleging bias against Kannadigas. Subsequently, he ordered closure of the office of Kannada Sahrudaya Balaga, a pro-Kannada organization which was functioning inside CFTRI premises. He also suspended two of its members. Later, the Council of Scientific and Industrial Research transferred Rajasekharan to New Delhi as the Director of Special Projects and Initiatives, which was contested by him before the tribunal. The tribunal ruled in favor of Rajasekharan.

Selected bibliography 
(Last 5 years)

See also 

 Food technology
 Dietary supplement

Notes

References

Further reading

External links 
 
 

N-BIOS Prize recipients
Indian scientific authors
Living people
Fellows of the Indian Academy of Sciences
Fellows of The National Academy of Sciences, India
1960 births
Scientists from Tamil Nadu
Fellows of the National Academy of Agricultural Sciences
Fellows of the Indian National Science Academy
Indian food scientists
Madurai Kamaraj University alumni
Indian Institute of Science alumni
University of Illinois Urbana-Champaign alumni
New Mexico State University faculty
DuPont people
Academic staff of Monash University
Indian Tamil people
People from Sivaganga district
Indian molecular biologists